Genotina is a genus of sea snails, marine gastropod mollusks in the family Mangeliidae,

Species
Species within the genus Genotina include:
 Genotina adamii (Bozzetti, 1994)
 Genotina genotae Vera-Peláez, 2004

References

 Vera-Peláez. 2004. Genotina genotae new species and new genus and Genota nigeriensis new species of the subfamily Conorbiinae (Gastropoda, Turridae). Systematic, biogeography, stratigraphy and phylogeny of Conorbis, Genotina and Genota genera. Pliocenica, 4 : 95-106 page(s): 98

External links
   Bouchet P., Kantor Yu.I., Sysoev A. & Puillandre N. (2011) A new operational classification of the Conoidea. Journal of Molluscan Studies 77: 273-308
 Worldwide Mollusc Species Data Base: Mangeliidae
  Global Names Index : Genotina